Wesley Johnson known by his stage name Wess (August 13, 1945 — September 21, 2009) was an American-born Italian singer and  bass guitarist, perhaps mostly known for representing Italy along with Dori Ghezzi in the Eurovision Song Contest 1975 in Stockholm, Sweden, placing third.

Originally from North Carolina, Wess moved to Italy in the 1960s in pursuit of a musical career. He formed a successful duo with Ghezzi and achieved some hits in Italy, such as "Voglio stare con te", "Come stai? Con chi sei?" and "Un corpo e un'anima". Wess also was a singer and played bass guitar for the soul-funk band Wess & The Airedales in the 1960s and early 1970s.

He died in New York during his United States tour when a breathing crisis led to his death.

Personal life 
He was the father of Deborah Johnson and UK-based R&B singer Romina Johnson, who often accompanied him as a backing singer.

In popular media 
In its winter 2018 issue, Oxford American magazine published an essay about Johnson's life as a young performer in Winston-Salem, North Carolina, and how his earliest experiences affected his career in Italy.

See also
List of bass guitarists

References

External links

Discography of Wess Johnson
Discography of Wess & The Airedales

1945 births
2009 deaths
Eurovision Song Contest entrants for Italy
Eurovision Song Contest entrants of 1975
Italian people of African-American descent
American male bass guitarists
20th-century African-American male singers
20th-century Italian male  singers
20th-century bass guitarists
American expatriates in Italy
American expatriate musicians
20th-century American bass guitarists
London Records artists
United Artists Records artists
African-American guitarists